Parumi Hajji Heydar (also Romanized as Parūmī Ḩājjī Ḩeydar; also known as Bārūmī, Borūmī, Pārūmī, and Pārūmīg) is a village in Kambel-e Soleyman Rural District, in the Central District of Chabahar County, Sistan and Baluchestan Province, Iran. At the 2006 census, its population was 346, in 68 families.

References 

Populated places in Chabahar County